The Ōhau River is a short river, some  long, that links Lake Ōhau with the artificial lake Ruataniwha in the Mackenzie Basin, New Zealand.

The river forms part of the traditional boundary between Otago and Canterbury regions.

References

Rivers of Canterbury, New Zealand
Rivers of Otago
Rivers of New Zealand